Parliamentary elections were held in Iran in 1952 to elect the 17th Iranian Majlis.

Conduct 
The elections were held by Government of Mosaddegh, who championed free elections and tried to minimize fraud by changing several governor-generals and governors. He also ordered members of the electoral supervisory councils to be selected by lot. However, the government was unable to control the shah, Artesh, the notables, and some of its own supporters. The voting process was stopped by Prime Minister Mohammad Mosaddegh after enough MPs were elected to form a parliamentary quorum (79 out of 136). The decision is viewed as manipulation, because Mosaddegh meant to prevent opposition candidates taking seats from rural areas. Richard Cottam describes the elections as "relatively free".

Results 
The highly organized Tudeh Party failed to win a single seat, despite receiving the second-highest number of votes.

In Tehran, the turnout was double that of previous election and the National Front candidates, including members of Iran Party, Toilers Party, Muslim Mojahedin and non-partisan nationalists won all twelve seats. In Tabriz, the nine deputies elected were supporters of Mossadegh.

According to David McDowall, in Mahabad the candidate known to be a Democratic Party of Iranian Kurdistan member was overwhelmingly elected but the results were annulled. However, Denise Natali states that the candidate was named Vaziri, who belonged to Tudeh Party. Royalist cleric Hassan Emami eventually took office representing the constituency and was elected as Speaker of the parliament. A CIA document states that the Shah was behind his election.

U.S. interference 
Historian Ervand Abrahamian, in an interview with Democracy Now!, said U.S. State Department documents declassified in 2017 reveal that their strategy was to undermine Mohammad Mosaddegh through parliament and the U.S. Central Intelligence Agency (CIA) spent lot of money to get their 18 favorable candidates elected.

References

1952 elections in Asia
1952 in Iran
National Consultative Assembly elections
CIA activities in Iran
Foreign electoral intervention
17th term of the Iranian Majlis
Lower house elections in Iran
Mohammad Mosaddegh